Green Light (Original Turkish title: Yeşil Işık)  is a 2002 Turkish romantic drama film, written and directed by Faruk Aksoy.

Plot
Elif is a married woman who has just caught her husband cheating. Ali is an investor on the verge of making a huge deal which could be very profitable, though at a high risk. The two cross paths at a bookstore and when they purchase the book "Yeşil Işık" ("Green Light"), and have a magical experience at the intervention of a figure observing them. When he loses all his money on the stock market after the September 11th terrorist attacks, Ali gets a heart attack . At the same time, Elif is discovered unconscious by her friend. They are both rushed to the same hospital, but Ali dies.

Ali reaches heaven, but he is refused entry into heaven and can't return to earth for a new life because his body has been buried and his (living) liver has been transplanted to another body. The figure who had been observing him all along, Yakup, turns out to be Ali's guardian angel and informs Ali that the person carrying his liver is Elif and the only solution would be to kill her.

Elif who is mourning after her mother death tries to commit suicide, but Ali remembering Elif from an encounter in a restaurant, saves her. After they spend the day together, Yakup warns Ali that he is endangering his own chances. Ali promises that he will kill her after a dinner date, but he unable to bring himself to do it. Instead they fall in love and drive to a hill to see if they can see the green light described in legend. When Ali is given the choice by Yakup to save himself or Elif, he sacrifices himself. But since their love was true, Ali is brought back to life. However Elif has no recollection of Ali or what took place.

Cast
 Hülya Avşar – Elif 
 Kenan Işık – Ali 
 Haldun Dormen – Yakup 
 Çolpan İlhan – Lamia 
 İlker İnanoğlu – Mehmet 
 Sema Atalay – Yeşim
 Uğur Kıvılcım – Gönül 
 Cengiz Küçükayvaz
 İpek Tenolcay
 Deniz Akkaya
 Arda Kural
 Yasemin Kozanoğlu
 Doğa Bekleriz
 Eşref Kolçak
 Ayumi Takano

Awards
Sema Atalay won the Golden Orange for Best Supporting Actress in 2002 for her role in the film.

References

External links
 

2002 films
2000s Turkish-language films
2002 romantic drama films
Films set in Turkey
Turkish fantasy films
Turkish romantic drama films